(born February 2, 2001) is a Japanese pop singer, dancer and model. She is a 12th generation member of Japanese girl group Morning Musume.

Biography

Makino joined Hello Pro Kenshusei on November 1, 2012, the news was later made public by Hello Project on November 20.  She was admitted to Hello Project's biggest group Morning Musume in 2014.

Overview

In summer 2014, Maria auditioned for the Morning Musume '14 (Golden) Audition! for an opportunity to join Morning Musume '14 and successfully passed. She was introduced as a 12th generation member during Morning Musume '14's concert at Nippon Budokan on September 30, alongside Haruna Ogata, Miki Nonaka and Akane Haga, effectively leaving Hello Pro Kenshusei the same day.

Hello! Project groups and units 
 Hello Pro Kenshusei (2012–2014)
 Morning Musume (2014–present)

Discography
For Maria Makino's releases with Morning Musume, see Morning Musume discography.

Filmography

DVDs and Blu-rays

Photobooks
 [2015.11.14] Makino Maria Mini Photobook "Greeting -Photobook-" (牧野真莉愛ミニ写真集「Greeting-Photobook-」)
 [2016.08.06] Maria
 [2017.08.30] Senkou Hanabi (せんこう花火)
 [2018.02.02] Maria 17sai (マリア17歳)
 [2018.08.25] Summer Days
 [2019.02.02] María 18 años
 [2020.02.02] Maria19
 [2021.02.02] Maria Hatachi (真莉愛二十歳)

References

2001 births
Living people
People from Nishio, Aichi
Musicians from Aichi Prefecture
Morning Musume members
Japanese women pop singers
Japanese female idols
Japanese gravure idols